Eobothus ('Dawn flounder') is an extinct genus of flatfish from the Eocene epoch of China, India and Europe.

Eobothus is significant as one of the earliest genera of flatfish, one of the last major fish groups to evolve. In the adult, the eyes were both located on the left side of the head, as in modern species, and the fish would have lain flat against the seafloor on its right side. This was an evolutionary advance from still earlier flatfish, such as Heteronectes, in which the eyes only partially migrated.

References

Eocene fish of Asia
Eocene fish of Europe
Pleuronectiformes
Prehistoric ray-finned fish genera